Ernest Thalayasingam MacIntyre, (a.k.a. Macintyre, Ernest Thalayasingam), (born 26 September 1934) is a Sri Lankan playwright of the English language, who has been active in the Sri Lankan English theatre for the last 50 years.

Early years
MacIntyre was born in Sri Lanka on 26 September 1934.

Career
MacIntyre attended Peradeniya University where he was a Dramsoc member. During the 1960s, MacIntyre was hailed as the most prolific and successful of Sri Lankan playwrights in English. 
He was a member of the performing group 'Stage and Set', which presented established international plays as well as those written by him.

MacIntyre is known for his absurd style, although Rasanayagam's Last Riot is written in a realistic mode. His plays were usually performed at the Lionel Wendt theatre in Colombo. During this time there was cross-pollination between the English and Sinhala theatres, primarily due to MacIntyre.

MacIntyre served in the Sri Lankan Air Force from 1961 to 1967, acted as the Director of the drama school at Aquinas University College in 1968 and 1969. From 1969 to 1973, he worked as UNESCO project officer.

In 2005, MacIntyre revived E.F.C. Ludowyk's He Comes from Jaffna in a production in Sydney, Australia, updating the script to reflect changes in social values. His version of this play, together with the scripts of Rasanayagam's Last Riot and He Still Comes From Jaffna, was published in the anthology Jaffna and Colombo.

In 2009 Macintyre wrote "Antigone in Sri Lanka as IRANGANI" A tragedy of our times derived from the ancient play of Sophoclese. It was performed in 2010 at the Belconnen Theatre in Canberra and the Riverside Theatre, Sydney. It was translated into Tamil in 2011.

In 2009 a PhD thesis on "Diasporic Longing and the Changing Contours of Resistance in The Plays of Ernest Thalayasingham Macintyre" was successfully submitted to The University of Madras by T. Sumathy.

Emigration
MacIntyre's emigration in 1973 brought a lull in creativity in the English theatre in Sri Lanka.

Works
 1967: The Full Circle of Caucasian Chalk
 ?: The President of the Old Boys' Club
 2000: He Still Comes From Jaffna
 1981: Let's Give Them Curry, An Australian-Asian Comedy in 3 Acts
 1971: The Education of Miss Asia
 1990: Rasanayagam's Last Riot
 1991: ''The Loneliness of the Short-Distance Traveller'

References

External links
 Macintyre, Ernest at AustLit

Sri Lankan dramatists and playwrights
Sri Lankan emigrants to Australia
Sri Lankan people of European descent
Alumni of the University of Peradeniya
1934 births
Living people